Ageiton is a monotypic genus of flies in the family Stratiomyidae. It is endemic to the Afrotropics, where it is widespread. The only species, Ageiton ater is black with short silver hairs (setae). It is similar to the three species of Cardopomyia, which are found in Madagascar.

References

Stratiomyidae
Brachycera genera
Taxa named by Kálmán Kertész
Diptera of Africa